Mansôa is a town located in the Oio Region of Guinea-Bissau. Population 7,376 (2008 est). The Sua language is spoken in Mansôa.

References

Oio Region
Populated places in Guinea-Bissau
Sectors of Guinea-Bissau